Concepción Channel is an inside passage of the Chilean Patagonia. It extends from the point where Wide Channel and Trinidad Channel meet to the open sea. Inocentes Channel is adjacent to the Concepción Channel.

See also
 Fjords and channels of Chile

References

External links
 United States Hydrographic Office, South America Pilot (1916)

Straits of Chile
Bodies of water of Magallanes Region